Alba was a British consumer electronics brand used for budget electronics. 

Established in 1917, Alba acquired its rival Bush in 1988, and was bought by the Home Retail Group, the parent company of the retailer Argos in 2008, who in turn was taken over by J Sainsbury plc in 2016. Products bearing the brand name were primarily sold at Argos, and to a lesser extent at Sainsbury's. The Alba brand was quietly dropped by Sainsbury's in 2022 and replaced by its more upmarket sister brand Bush, which has a similar history.

History

Original A.J. Balcombe / Alba company
The name Alba originated as a trademark used on radio and television produced by A.J. Balcombe Ltd. The company was formed in 1917 or 1918 by Alfred Balcombe. Alba began by manufacturing radio sets from 1922.

In the 1960s they became Alba Group, and made only low-cost consumer products.

Alba went into receivership in June 1982. During that time, it was a significant contributor to the development of the British radio & TV industry.

Under Harvard International

Following the demise of the original company, the Alba name was bought in 1982 by Harvard International.

In 1987, Harvard International renamed itself Alba plc and was floated on the London Stock Exchange under its new name. Alba plc bought Bush in 1988, followed by Goodmans in 1994.

Alba also produced electronic products under licence for other companies or individuals, including Antony Worrall Thompson, Cable and Wireless, Carl Lewis, JCB, Ministry of Sound, Nicky Clarke and NTL.

The company sold its share of the Grundig brand for £25.5m in December 2007, although it retained the UK distribution rights until 2010.

Acquisition by Home Retail Group
In November 2008, the Alba and Bush names were purchased by Home Retail Group, the parent company of Homebase and Argos, for £15.25 million. As a result, Alba Group (the former owner) reverted to its previous name, Harvard International, the following year.

Purchase by Sainsbury's
In September 2016, the British supermarket chain Sainsbury's completed its acquisition of Home Retail Group, bringing Argos, along with the Alba and Bush brands, under its ownership.

The Alba brand was quietly dropped by Sainsbury's in 2022 and replaced by its more upmarket sister brand Bush, which has a similar history.

References

External links

Alba at Argos.co.uk

Electronics companies of the United Kingdom
Electronics industry in London
British brands